Leslie Carol Rutledge (born June 9, 1976) is an American attorney and politician from the state of Arkansas, served as the 56th attorney general of Arkansas from 2015 to 2023. She is the 21st lieutenant governor of Arkansas, since 2023. Rutledge is a member of the Republican Party.

Rutledge served as counsel for Governor Mike Huckabee before she was elected to be attorney general in 2014. After serving two terms as attorney general, she was elected lieutenant governor in the 2022 elections.

Early life and education
Rutledge was born in Southside, Arkansas. She graduated from Southside High School, the University of Arkansas, and the William H. Bowen School of Law at the University of Arkansas at Little Rock.

Career 
Rutledge began her legal career as law clerk to the Arkansas Court of Appeals Judge Josephine Hart, since associate justice of the Arkansas Supreme Court. She was appointed deputy counsel for Arkansas Governor Mike Huckabee and later served as legal counsel on Huckabee's 2008 presidential campaign. She has also been a deputy prosecuting attorney in Lonoke County and in subsequent service as attorney for the State of Arkansas's Division of Children and Family Services. She served as Deputy Counsel at the National Republican Congressional Committee before she was named counsel for the Republican National Committee. Prior to her election as attorney general, Rutledge went into private practice in Little Rock.

Attorney General of Arkansas
Rutledge sought the Republican nomination for Attorney General of Arkansas in the 2014 election. She faced fellow attorneys Patricia Nation and David Sterling. Rutledge finished with a plurality in the primary but finished with less than 50 percent of the vote. She hence faced second-place finisher David Sterling in a runoff election. Nation endorsed Rutledge, and she defeated Sterling.

In September 2014, County Clerk Larry Crane of Pulaski County canceled Rutledge's voter registration when he discovered that Rutledge had registered to vote in Washington, D.C. She re-registered in Pulaski County.

Notably, during the 2014 AETN Televised Debate, Leslie Rutledge compared smart phones to "the devil".

Rutledge defeated Democratic Party nominee Nate Steel, a member of the Arkansas House of Representatives, and Libertarian Party nominee Aaron Cash, in the general election. She is the first Republican and woman thus far to have been elected Attorney General of Arkansas.

In 2016, Rutledge stated that she would appeal a ruling supporting LGBT anti-discrimination laws enacted in Fayetteville, Arkansas, that is in opposition to a state law prohibiting these ordinances.

In July 2017, Texas Attorney General Ken Paxton led a group of Republican Attorneys General from nine other states, including Rutledge, plus Idaho Governor Butch Otter, in threatening the Donald Trump administration that they would litigate if the president did not terminate the Deferred Action for Childhood Arrivals policy that had been put into place by president Barack Obama. Tennessee Attorney General Herbert Slatery subsequently reversed his position and withdrew his participation from the proposed suit on August 31. Slatery went further to urge passage of the DREAM Act. The other Attorneys General who joined in making the threats against Trump included Steve Marshall of Alabama, Lawrence Wasden of Idaho, Derek Schmidt of Kansas, Jeff Landry of Louisiana, Doug Peterson of Nebraska, Alan Wilson of South Carolina, and Patrick Morrisey of West Virginia.

In June 2017, Rutledge again rejected a proposed state constitutional amendment to legalize casino gambling in the state. She rejected the proposal by Barry Emigh of Hot Springs, writing that the proposed popular name and ballot title are "misleading and wholly deficient."

Rutledge ran for re-election to the office of attorney general in 2018 against Democratic nominee Mike Lee and Libertarian nominee Kerry Hicks. With 98% percent of precincts reporting, Rutledge led with 61.97% of the vote. Lee and Hicks received 35.25% and 2.78% of the vote, respectively.

In 2019, Attorneys General from all 50 U.S. States including AG Rutledge, the District of Columbia, and all four U.S. territories were urged by NAAG to support a bill, the Secure and Fair Enforcement (SAFE) Banking Act (H.R. 1595), sponsored by U.S. Rep. Ed Perlmutter (D-Colo.), which would permit marijuana-related businesses in states and territories to use the banking system. The bill would facilitate collection of taxes levied on the $8.3 billion industry, reduce the danger of operating cash-only businesses and more effectively monitor the industry.

On December 17, 2020 the Supreme Court of the United States sided with Rutledge and ultimately upheld an Arkansas law that allowed the state to regulate powerful pharmacy benefit managers. The unanimous decision of the Court in Rutledge v. PCMA, a landmark case, will forever change the legal landscape with regard to large pharmaceutical conglomerates.

In February 2021, Rutledge proposed a bill that would prohibit transgender athletes from playing on girls' sports teams in K–12 schools.

When the Supreme Court of the United States handed down its decision in Dobbs v. Jackson Women's Health Organization, Rutledge led Arkansas to become one of the first states to outlaw abortions except to save the life of the mother. Arkansas Act 180 of 2019 effectively outlawed abortion upon the attorney general's certification that the Supreme Court overruled Roe v. Wade.

After the August 2022 announcement of the Biden administration's executive action forgiving a portion of student loan debt, AG Rutledge joined a lawsuit with five other states, causing a temporary halt to the plan. The United States Court of Appeals for the Eighth Circuit has issued an injunction, preventing Biden's plan from going into effect.

Constituent outreach 
Rutledge has hosted "Rutledge Roundtables" with constituents in all 75 Arkansas counties each year. She has also established a Public Integrity Division, and held mobile offices annually in every county. Rutledge also founded a Military and Veterans Initiative and a Cooperative Disability Investigations program.

Rutledge is a self-described defender of the Second Amendment, religious freedom, and pro-life values.

Media appearances 
At the first presidential debate of the 2016 presidential election, Rutledge sat on a CBS News panel and stated people did not care about Donald Trump's tax returns but rather about jobs and national security. This led to an extended exchange with journalist Bob Schieffer, who asked for evidence of her statement, mentioning national polling data. Rutledge later stated she had conducted roundtable discussions with constituents in the state.
Asked about the discussion in an Arkansas Money and Politics interview, Rutledge stated it was to be expected because the other panelists were part of the “liberal elite media,” and later stated she preferred more polite discourse.

In October 2022, Rutledge was interviewed on The Problem with Jon Stewart about the state having banned gender-affirming care for minors. She stated that for each expert recommending that, there was another who disagreed. When asked what medical organization supports banning certain treatments or procedures, she was unable to name one, saying the information was in their legal briefs elsewhere and in testimony before the Arkansas legislature. The Arkansas Times characterized some of the testimony before the legislature on the issue as "rooted more in religion than medicine" and that the "medical testimony from established experts against the legislation was extensive and reflected in the court record."

Lieutenant governor
In 2020, Rutledge announced her candidacy in the 2022 Arkansas gubernatorial election. In November 2021, she switched to the race for lieutenant governor. She won the Republican nomination. Rutledge defeated Democrat Kelly Krout in the November 8, 2022, general election. Rutledge, along with Governor Sarah Huckabee Sanders, became the first women elected independently to serve as governor and lieutenant governor in United States history.

Personal life
In 2013, Rutledge met Boyce Johnson, a farmer, at a convention for the American Farm Bureau Federation. Johnson graduated from the University of Arkansas in 1982 with a B.S. degree in agriculture. He formerly served as President of the Dale Bumpers College of Agricultural, Food and Life Sciences Alumni Society board of directors. The couple wed in December 2015. In April 2018, Rutledge announced she was expecting her first child. In July 2018, Rutledge gave birth to a daughter. She was the first Arkansas constitutional officer to give birth while holding office.

Electoral history

See also
 List of female state attorneys general in the United States

References

External links

|-

|-

|-

 

 

1976 births
20th-century American lawyers
20th-century American women lawyers
21st-century American lawyers
21st-century American politicians
21st-century American women lawyers
21st-century American women politicians
Arkansas Attorneys General
Arkansas lawyers
Arkansas Republicans
Lieutenant Governors of Arkansas
Living people
People from Batesville, Arkansas
University of Arkansas alumni
William H. Bowen School of Law alumni
Women in Arkansas politics